The River Afton (or Afton Water) is a small river in Ayrshire, Scotland, which flows north from Alwhat Hill in the Carsphairn and Scaur Hills, through Afton Reservoir and then for eight miles down Glen Afton before joining the River Nith at New Cumnock.

New Cumnock in the Afton area was the scene of the Knockshinnoch Disaster in 1950.

The river is celebrated in Robert Burns's poem Sweet Afton and this led to a number of townships in the United States being called Afton.

References

Rivers of East Ayrshire